Brian the Sun is a Japanese Rock band from Osaka, Japan.

History 
The band was formed in 2007 in Osaka by Ryota Mori and Haruki Hakuyama. The name was inspired by the Arctic Monkeys song Brianstorm.

The band's songs have been used for numerous Anime series' including 'Heroes' being used for My Hero Academia, 'Maybe' being used for Sweetness and Lightning and 'Sunny Side Up' used for Please Take My Brother Away!.

Discography

Singles

Distribution limited single

Mini Album

Album

References 

2007 establishments in Japan
Japanese rock music groups
Musical groups established in 2007
Musical groups from Osaka